Barragán is the ninth studio album by American alternative rock band Blonde Redhead. It was released on September 2, 2014 by Kobalt Label Services. The album was produced, engineered and mixed by Drew Brown, and was recorded at Key Club Recording in Benton Harbor, Michigan and the Magic Shop in New York City.

Prior to its official release, Barragán was made available to stream online on August 24, 2014.

Critical reception

At Metacritic, which assigns a weighted average score out of 100 to reviews from mainstream critics, Barragán received a score of 64 out of 100 based on 18 reviews, indicating "generally favorable reviews".

Barragáns light, almost minimalistic sound compared to previous Blonde Redhead albums was received with mixed feelings. Exclaim! reviewer Cam Lindsay summarized that "Barragán is not an album determined to grab you in one listen; it's a 'grower,' as they say, but once it grows, it's apparent there's no shortage of baroque delights to discover on this veteran band's ninth album." PopMatters Zachary Houle was more critical, arguing that the music "lacks any kind of clarity in direction", and that fans might be alienated by "a band that is reinventing itself for the sake of reinvention."

Track listing

Personnel
Credits are adapted from the album's liner notes.

Blonde Redhead
 Kazu Makino – vocals, Chamberlin and Mellotron keyboards, harpsichord, organ, piano, synthesizer
 Amedeo Pace – vocals, acoustic guitar, baritone guitar, electric guitar, bass, Chamberlin and Mellotron keyboards, harpsichord, organ, piano, synthesizer
 Simone Pace – drums, percussion, drum programming, organ, piano, synthesizer

Additional musicians

 Drew Brown – Chamberlin keyboard, synthesizer, drum programming, Max/MSP, field recordings
 Jason Falkner – bass, electric guitar
 David Garza – bass, electric guitar, organ
 Mauro Refosco – percussion, mallets
 J. Williams – synthesizer

Production

 Drew Brown – production, engineering, mixing
 Jason Chang – engineering (assistant)
 Sean Gavigan – engineering (assistant)
 Kabir Hermon – engineering
 John Horne – engineering (assistant)
 David Ives – engineering, mastering
 Lex – software design
 Jessica Ruffins – engineering
 Bill Skibbe – engineering

Design

 Claude Cahun – cover photography
 Tim Flach – photography
 Lucie Kim – artwork
 Kazu Makino – artwork

Charts

References

External links
 
 

2014 albums
Blonde Redhead albums